Lidgett is a surname. Notable persons with that name include:
Elizabeth Lidgett (1843–1919), British Poor Law guardian and suffragist
Jeni Lidgett (born 1964), Australian sailor
John Scott Lidgett (1854–1953), British Wesleyan Methodist minister and educationist